Ruppia spiralis is an aquatic plant species in the genus Ruppia of Ruppiaceae. This name was synonymized under R. cirrhosa, but is resurrected for the species previously referred to as R. cirrhosa.

References

Brackish water plants
spiralis